Maël Ambonguilat (born 9 November 1997) is a Gabonese swimmer. He competed in the men's 50 metre freestyle event at the 2016 Summer Olympics. The first Olympic swimmer to compete for Gabon, Amboniguilat ranked 75th with a time of 27.21 seconds. He did not advance to the semifinals.

References

External links
 

1997 births
Living people
Gabonese male freestyle swimmers
Olympic swimmers of Gabon
Swimmers at the 2016 Summer Olympics
Place of birth missing (living people)
21st-century Gabonese people